Robert Linwood Helmly (born June 8, 1927) is an American former politician. He served in the South Carolina House of Representatives and  South Carolina Senate for Berkeley County, South Carolina as a Democrat. He was born in Savannah, Georgia and was the president of a telephone company. He resides in Moncks Corner, South Carolina.

References

|-

|-

Living people
1927 births
Democratic Party South Carolina state senators